Indian School/Central Avenue (also known as Steele Indian School Park) is a station on the Metro light rail line in Phoenix, Arizona, United States. It is the sixth stop southbound and the twenty-third stop northbound on the initial 20 mile starter line.

Notable places nearby
 Steele Indian School Park at the site of the Phoenix Indian School
 Phoenix School of Law
 Phoenix Central Neighborhood
 Carl T. Hayden VA Medical Center
 Kindred Hospital Phoenix
 Phoenix City Square

Ridership

References

External links
 Valley Metro map

Valley Metro Rail stations in Phoenix, Arizona
Railway stations in the United States opened in 2008
2008 establishments in Arizona